

Mount Whisler is a mountain of the British Empire Range on Canada's Ellesmere Island. It is the second highest peak of the British Empire Range, of Ellesmere Island, and of the Arctic Cordillera. The Henrietta Nesmith Glacier completely surrounds Mount Whisler.

The United States Army Signal Corps first mapped Mount Whisler in 1882 during their Lady Franklin Bay Expedition. It was named for Private William Whisler, a member of the party.

Further reading

References

Sources 
Geographical Names of the Ellesmere Island National Park Reserve and Vicinity by Geoffrey Hattersley-Smith (1998)

External links 
 Mount Whisler at Index Mundi 

Whisler, Mount
Two-thousanders of Nunavut